Sergio Ceballos Hernández (born 16 February 1994), is a Mexican professional footballer who plays as a midfielder for Liga de Expansión MX club Pumas Tabasco, on loan from UNAM.

Honours
Tepatitlán
Liga de Expansión MX: Guardianes 2021

References

External links
 

1994 births
Living people
Sportspeople from Torreón
Footballers from Coahuila
Mexican footballers
Association football midfielders
Santos Laguna footballers
Club Puebla players
Tampico Madero F.C. footballers
Potros UAEM footballers
C.D. Tepatitlán de Morelos players
Liga MX players
Ascenso MX players
Liga Premier de México players